Manfred von Karma, known as  in the original Japanese language versions, is a fictional prosecutor in Capcom's Ace Attorney video game series. Von Karma is featured as the main antagonist of the first game of the series, returning as a minor character in the prequel segments of the spin-off title Ace Attorney Investigations: Miles Edgeworth and its sequel. The character has also appeared in film, anime and manga adaptations of the series, and has received a universally positive critical reception, his presence and narrative impact particularly noted.

Conception and creation

Manfred von Karma was conceived by director Shu Takumi as an early version of Miles Edgeworth, as an unlikable and tragic 36-year-old veteran prosecutor, of whom Takumi's staff decided was not "interesting enough" as a rival to maintain for the entirety of the game. Following Edgeworth's recharacterization, Von Karma was similarly developed from the original Edgeworth concept, with both characters designed with cravats to indicate a European influence.

Von Karma's English and Japanese surname, Karma, references the spiritual principle of cause and effect, with its Japanese romanization , which equates to English to mean "a demon who hunts". His Japanese given name, Gou, similarly comes from the word , meaning "the effect of karma". Von Karma's English first name, Manfred, means "man of peace" in German, an intended ironic name given his characterisation, while also simultaneously acting as tribute to Manfred von Richthofen, a World War I flying ace nicknamed "The Red Baron".

Characteristics and backstory
At the time of Phoenix Wright: Ace Attorney, Manfred von Karma is a veteran prosecutor. Described as "legendary", he has never lost a case in his 40 year career. Rather than simply arguing his case, Von Karma uses intimidation techniques and pressure to bypass relevant evidence and ensure conviction regardless of the defendant's actual innocence or guilt.

After being recorded by Gregory Edgeworth as having coerced a false confession from a witness, Von Karma receives a penalty from then-Chief Prosecutor Bansai Ichiyanagi, blemishing his otherwise perfect career. Left wandering the courthouse after receiving his penalty in a state of shock, after an earthquake strikes, Von Karma comes across Gregory unconscious from oxygen deprivation in an elevator alongside his son Miles and court bailiff Yanni Yogi. After being accidentally shot in the shoulder by the younger briefly-awakened Edgeworth, believing fate to be on his side, Von Karma shoots Gregory in the heart, killing him instantly. Leaving the gun at the scene and fleeing, Von Karma takes a vacation for six months in order to heal from his injury, under the guise of embarrassment at his penalty. Deciding on a whim to adopt the younger Edgeworth who had shot him, Von Karma trains him alongside his daughter Franziska to become prosecutors, with both respectively becoming prosecutors at 20 and 13, respectively nicknamed the "demon" and "prodigy" prosecutors. He accompanies Edgeworth to his first case in Ace Attorney Investigations: Miles Edgeworth.

Fifteen years after killing Gregory and witnessing Edgeworth lose two consecutive cases against Phoenix Wright, Von Karma anonymously sends a letter to Yogi, who had been blamed for Gregory's murder, with a detailed plan to murder his former attorney Robert Hammond and frame Edgeworth for the murder, seeking to cover up all loose ends on the case before the statute of limitations on Gregory's murder expires in four days. After Phoenix (now acting as Edgeworth's defense attorney) comes across Von Karma destroying files from the police's evidence room, Von Karma attacks him with a stun gun before leaving, unknowingly leaving behind the bullet that killed Gregory. After Yogi is exposed in court by Phoenix, leading an unconcerned Von Karma to lose the first case in his career, Edgeworth confesses to having killed Gregory himself, having misremembered his repressed memory of shooting Von Karma as having shot his father. Realizing Von Karma's previous actions to indicate him to be the true murderer, Phoenix presents the bullet to the court and, after correctly deducing the younger Edgeworth to have shot Von Karma, uses a metal detector given to him by Dick Gumshoe to detect the bullet — still lodged in Von Karma's shoulder — and requests that it be compared to the bullet that killed Gregory. Recognizing that such an examination would expose him, Von Karma lets out a guttural scream (recognized by Edgeworth) and admits both to his defeat and his crimes, before calling for an immediate end to the trial and his prompt arrest. By the following year, Von Karma has been prosecuted of his crimes, and was later implied to have died at some point between the events of Rise From the Ashes and Phoenix Wright: Ace Attorney – Justice for All.

Appearances

Ace Attorney video games
In the first game, Phoenix Wright: Ace Attorney, Von Karma is introduced as a veteran prosecutor who has not lost a single case in his forty-year career, having adopted future "demon prosecutor" Miles Edgeworth following his father Gregory's murder fifteen years earlier. Defending Edgeworth in the fourth case for the murder of defense attorney Robert Hammond, Phoenix is tasered by Von Karma during his investigation, uncovering that former bailiff Yanni Yogi (who had been acquitted by Hammond of killing Gregory by reason of insanity) had shot Hammond with a gun provided by Von Karma, for having forced him to fake insanity and have his personal life collapse. After Edgeworth subsequently claims to have actually accidentally killed his father as a child, Phoenix proves that Von Karma had in fact killed Gregory: years earlier, Gregory had ruined Von Karma's spotless record by convincing a judge to penalize him for misconduct. Unable to handle a blemish on his legacy, Von Karma had shot Gregory upon finding him unconscious in an elevator, and Edgeworth had in turn shot Von Karma in the shoulder after throwing a gun. Finding the bullet still lodged in Von Karma's shoulder using a metal detector, Phoenix forces Von Karma into a breakdown, and he is arrested, the day before the statute of limitations for his crime would have run out.

In Phoenix Wright: Ace Attorney – Justice for All and Phoenix Wright: Ace Attorney – Trials and Tribulations, references to Von Karma indicate that he was found guilty of all charges; while not directly stated, he is implied that he was sentenced to death and died while in prison. After Edgeworth fakes his death, Von Karma's 18-year-old daughter and Edgeworth's adoptive sister Franziska, a prodigy prosecutor, travels to Los Angeles in order to face Phoenix in court and "redeem" her family name. Following the game's climax, Franziska confronts Edgeworth over their relationship with their father and her dependency on his tactics, before breaking down in tears.

Ace Attorney Investigations video games
In a prequel case in Ace Attorney Investigations: Miles Edgeworth, set five years before Phoenix Wright: Ace Attorney, Von Karma and Franziska accompany Edgeworth to the District Court to witness his first trial as a prosecutor, quizzing Edgeworth on the case's details. However, after the trial is cancelled due to the defendant and original prosecutor being found murdered, Von Karma assigns Edgeworth and Franziska the task of leading the subsequent investigation into the pair's murders, before leaving the pair alone to continue investigating after a detective is falsely arrested.

In a prequel case in Ace Attorney Investigations 2, set sixteen years before Phoenix Wright: Ace Attorney, how Von Karma acquired his first and only penalty due to Gregory Edgeworth is explored, leading him to develop his motive for murder the following year. In the present cases, set one month after Phoenix Wright: Ace Attorney – Trials and Tribulations, Miles Edgeworth confronts his choice to continue being a prosecutor after learning Von Karma had killed his defense attorney father, confronting his conflicted feelings towards both father figures and his place in the world.

Other appearances

Manfred von Karma appears in a Japanese manga adaptation of the series, written by Kenji Kuroda, illustrated by Kazuo Maekawa and published by Kodansha. The series was published in the United States by Kodansha USA. An additional manga, published by Del Rey Manga, was released in the United States.

Ryo Ishibashi portrays Von Karma in the 2012 live-action film Ace Attorney. The film loosely adapts the events of the first game and Von Karma's murder of Gregory Edgeworth; unlike the game, Von Karma murdered Gregory in a courtroom's evidence locker room after he had uncovered Von Karma to have tampered with evidence – Von Karma is additionally established as the mastermind behind the murder of Mia Fey, having hired photojournalist Redd White to kill her and retrieve notes and evidence on his illegal actions, which Phoenix finds hidden within the statue of The Thinker she had been murdered with.

Von Karma appears as the main antagonist of the first season of the 2016 Ace Attorney anime series, which adapts the events of the first three games in the series over two seasons. He is voiced by Akio Ōtsuka in Japanese and Bill Jenkins in English. Von Karma additionally appears in multiple flashback episodes throughout the second season depicting how he raised Edgeworth and Franziska.

Von Karma makes minor appearances in Ace Attorney Investigations: Miles Edgeworth and its sequel, featuring Miles and Gregory Edgeworth as playable characters. He also makes an appearance in Teppen: Ace vs. The People as a collectible card. In The Great Ace Attorney: Adventures, Kazuma Asogi wields a Japanese katana dubbed "Karuma" (Karma), referring to its name in The Great Ace Attorney 2: Resolve as having been adopted as the surname of at least one of the disciples of his father, indicating that one of these disciples is the ancestor of the Von Karma family.

Reception
Von Karma was received well by critics, especially for his sense of presence and narrative impact. The Gamer praised Von Karma as "one of the most memorable parts of the original Ace Attorney, Manfred's nigh-demonic presence in the courtroom has made him an enduring antagonist [despite] his limited screentime", comparatively comparing them to Spirit of Justice antagonist Queen Ga'ran Sigatar Khura'in "[a]s a fascinating antagonist whose dirty tricks push both the defense and the player to the limit." Destructoid commented on Von Karma serving as [social] commentary on the Japanese legal system and its failings, both "parodying [and] criticizing prosecution" as a concept, listing the character among their "best examples of scum and villainy" and describing them as "irredeemably terrible, believing in not just results no matter the cost, but also a total disdain for nearly everyone around him since they most likely aren't as perfect as him."

Kotaku praised Von Karma's casting in the 2012 live-action Ace Attorney film as "spot on". Von Karma was also well received in the anime adaptation. Reviewing "Turnabout Goodbyes – 2nd Trial", Lauren Orsini of Anime News Network stated that: "Von Karma is a good example of someone from the games that has stayed exactly the same but comes across differently in the show. He's still the same horrible old prosecutor with the same acidic lines, but the simplistic (cheap) animation has given Von Karma a distinctly less threatening and more cartoony look and feel than he has in the game. Animated, we see Von Karma as just one element in the larger courtroom, and his grasp on the case feels more tenuous than before."

References

Ace Attorney characters
Capcom antagonists
Fictional American people in video games
Fictional German American people
Fictional German people in video games
Fictional criminals in video games
Fictional murderers
Fictional prosecutors
Fictional suicides
Male characters in video games
Male video game villains
Video game characters introduced in 2001